Janeth Susana Montero Preciado (born July 20, 1981), known professionally as Jasú Montero, is an Ecuadorian singer, presenter, and actress.

Early years
Montero was born in Guayaquil on July 20, 1981.

Career
In 2000, age 19, she joined the musical group Kandela & Son, part of its second and third generation, along with Jordana Doylet, María Fernanda Ríos, and manager Loly Ochoa. At the beginning she was inexperienced, but with a good musical ear, and had to learn body language, singing, tuning, music theory, dance, and choreography through rehearsals during her first six months, in addition to learning to wear heels and put on makeup, which she had not done before. She adopted the stage name Jasú for the group.

In 2006, she made her first foray into television when the group appeared on the TC Televisión contest program .

In 2008, they had their own reality show called "En busca de la quinta Kandela (In Search of the Fifth Kandela)" on Gama TV.

She was a juror on the reality show "Oye mi canto" on Ecuavisa. She also participated in Bailando por un sueño, edición especial on Gama TV, and was part of TC Televisión's Soy el mejor VIP.

She had an antagonistic role in the comedy Los Hijos de Don Juan on TC Televisión, playing Ruperta Palomeque.

In 2016, she joined the cast of the TC Televisión program , sharing the stage with Ana Buljubasich and Carla Hall.

In 2014, she left Kandela & Son and became part of the group "Las Tr3s", with Jordana Doylet, Dora West, and manager Andrea Pesantez. Las Tr3s broke up in 2017.

Personal life
Montero married Ronny Castro, the singer of the group Millenium, in 2008, and they divorced in 2009. She has one daughter.

Filmography

TV series and telenovelas

TV programs

Discography
Montero has released the following singles through Universal Music Ecuador:

 "Yo Te Espero"
 "Iluso"
 "Rockolas" (feat. Jenny Rosero)
 "Me Siento Viva"

References

External links

21st-century Ecuadorian women singers
Ecuadorian telenovela actresses
Ecuadorian women television presenters
1981 births

Living people
People from Guayaquil
Women in Latin music